Orikhiv is a city in Polohy Raion, Zaporizhzhia Oblast, Ukraine. As of January 2022 its population was approximately

History
Orikhiv was founded in about 1783 near the Konka River; it was incorporated in 1801. In 1818 Orikhiv appeared to be a place where military personnel of the Czar were stationed; an officer from Orikhiv came out to finalize arrangements for the Czar's visit to Lindenau in May of that year. As early as 1836 a “Salt Road” (Tschumakemveg) connected Orikhiv with Perekop to the south, the road running through the Molochna Kolonia. This road was still shown on maps of 1852. In 1850 Orikhiv was within the boundaries of Taurida, near the northeast border of that province. When the railway was built connecting Aleksandrovsk to Berdyansk it went through Orikhiv, presumably helping the development of the city and giving easy access to the port at Berdyansk.

The first Mennonites likely settled in Orikhiv as early as the 1830s. By 1852 there were two windmills in Orikhiv owned by Mennonites (Kornelius Ediger and Kornelius Heinrichs) as well as a treadmill and oil press operated by Aaron Wiens. In the 1860s a number of families moved from Schoenwiese of the Khortytsia Colony to Orikhiv. Among these was Johann Heinrich (Ivan Andreievitch) Janzen, who built two large steam-powered flour mills and encouraged other Mennonite businessmen to follow his example.

By 1874 the small Mennonite community, in cooperation with the equally small Lutheran group, had built a church and a school. Apparently the Mennonites and Lutherans had joint services in the church, but for major festivals the Mennonites tended to go to their home churches, for many this being Schoenwiese in the Chortitza Colony. They also went back to their home churches to allow the young people to meet prospective marriage partners.

In 1874 Johann Heinrich (Ivan Andreievich) Janzen was elected mayor of Orikhiv. Despite some opposition from the business community because Janzen was German, the governor of the province encouraged him to continue in his position, Orihiv being one of the few cities with a positive balance sheet despite an aggressive school building program. Janzen retired in 1899.
At the end of the nineteenth century, of a population of 10,000, there were only about 200 "Germans" in total (called niemsty), which included approximately equal numbers of Mennonites and Lutherans.
Only one Mennonite estate, Rosenheim (Epp) was listed as being close to Orihiv, while Wintergruen Estate was 14 verst east-southeast of the city. These estates no longer exist.

Peter Kondratyevitch Pavlenko was principal of the Halbstadt Zentralschule in 1909 and 1910, also teaching in the areas of mathematics and pedagogy; before that he had been on the faculty of the secondary school in Orikhiv.
In 1918–1919 Orikhiv was in the centre of the area controlled by the anarchist Nestor Makhno, so it likely suffered the usual consequences of being occupied by his army. During the subsequent Civil War it was overrun a number of times as the vicissitudes of war caused frequent changes in the struggles between the Whites and the Reds. Orikhiv was the base from which the Red Army surged southward to finally defeat the Mennonite Selbstschutz -eventually leading to the capitulation in Gnadenfeld, Molotschna.

Orikhiv attained city status in 1938. In 1972 it was the capital of the Orikhiv Region of Zaporizhzhia Oblast. In 1990 the population was 21,200. Main industries produced clothing, machinery and building supplies. There is a metallurgy plant, "Orikhiv Quarry of Molding Materials," which deals with refractory materials, and a sugar refinery. The city also has a regional museum.
There are no obvious traces of the Mennonite past remaining.

2022 Russian invasion 

On 7 May 2022, around 21:00 Orikhiv hospital was shelled by Russian forces. According to the local government, Russian forces wanted to finish off the wounded and kill civilian doctors. On 21 May, local media reported that as a result of the Russian shelling, the gymnasium, and the building of the city executive committee were destroyed.

According to OCHA, by 17 August the town's population had dwindled to 6,000. As of October 2022, Russian forces were regularly shelling Orikhiv. The American organization for senior citizens, AARP, profiled one family's desperate choices to stay in their familiar Orikhiv, or to leave under threat of Russian bombing.

The OCHA has a presence in the city.

Gallery

References

Cities in Zaporizhzhia Oblast
Berdyansky Uyezd
Cities of district significance in Ukraine
Populated places established in the Russian Empire
Blackboard places